Kennythorpe is a hamlet in the civil parish of Burythorpe, and the Ryedale district of North Yorkshire, England. It was historically part of the East Riding of Yorkshire until 1974.

In 1823 Kennythorpe (then Kennythorp), was in the civil parish of Langton, and the Wapentake of Buckrose in the East Riding of Yorkshire. Population at the time was 83.

References

Villages in North Yorkshire